Verdier is a French surname. Notable people with the surname include:

 Arthur Verdier (1835–1898), French mariner, shipowner, merchant and pioneer
 Fabienne Verdier (born 1962), French painter
 Guillaume Verdier, French naval architect
 Henri Verdier, French Ambassador for digital affairs
 Jean Verdier (1864–1940), French Cardinal of the Roman Catholic Church
 Jean-Antoine Verdier (1767–1839), French general
 Jean-Louis Verdier, mathematician, inventor of Verdier duality
 Jerome Verdier, Liberian human rights activist
 Julien Verdier (1910–1999), French actor
 Justine Verdier, French pianist
 Nicolas Verdier, French footballer
 Paul A. Verdier (died 1996), licensed psychologist in California
 Suzanne Verdier (1745–1813), French writer.

See also
Éditions Verdier, a French publishing company

French-language surnames